The BetVictor European Series is a snooker tournament series established in 2019. It was expanded from four tournaments in the 2019–20 season to six tournaments in the 2020–21 season and then to eight tournaments in the 2021–22 season and 2022–23 season. The player who wins the most cumulative prize money in European Series events each season receives a bonus prize of £150,000. Judd Trump won the bonus prize in the first two seasons, while John Higgins won the bonus in the third season and Robert Milkins in the fourth.

Events 
The BetVictor European Series was established in 2019, and initially consisted of four tournaments: European Masters, German Masters, Shoot Out, Gibraltar Open.

For the 2020–21 season, the Championship League and Welsh Open were included. 

For the 2021–22 season, the other three Home Nations Series events (Northern Ireland Open, English Open, Scottish Open) were added, while the Championship League was removed, bringing the total number of events in the series to eight.

For the 2022–23 season, the European Series has been renamed to the BetVictor Series. The Championship League has been re-added to the series, whereas the Gibraltar Open has been removed.

Series winners 
In the first two years of the bonus being awarded, Judd Trump was the only player to collect the bonus. Trump won the series in the 2019–20 season after winning the 2020 Gibraltar Open in March, and then won the series again in the 2020–21 season after Mark Selby, the only other contender to win the series at the time, lost in the third round of the 2021 Gibraltar Open.

In the 2021–22 season, eleven players remained in contention for the bonus at the outset of the series' final tournament, the 2022 Gibraltar Open. John Higgins was top of the list, ahead of Mark Allen on countback. Higgins won the £150,000 prize after the last remaining contender Ricky Walden, who needed to win the tournament to claim the bonus, lost in the semi-finals.

Eleven players were also in contention for the BetVictor bonus at the outset of the series' final event, the 2023 Welsh Open, in the 2022–23 snooker season. Robert Milkins won the series by winning the tournament, edging over Ali Carter who was the Series' leader at the beginning of the tournament.

Results

Statistics

Tournament winners

Notes

References

 
Snooker competitions in the United Kingdom

Snooker tours and series